Patrick Bauer may refer to:
B. Patrick Bauer (born 1944), American politician
Patrick Bauer (footballer) (born 1992), German football player